Dobranje may refer to:

 Dobranje, Dubrovnik-Neretva County, a village near Zažablje, Croatia
 Dobranje, Split-Dalmatia County, a village near Cista Provo, Croatia